The Coral are an English indie rock/neo-psychedelia band from Hoylake, the Wirral formed in 1996. As of 2016, they have recorded over 150 songs, released on eight studio albums, one compilation album, three EPs and eighteen singles. The band's first single "Shadows Fall" was released in 2001 and four of their songs - "Dreaming of You" (from The Coral), "Don't Think You're the First" and "Pass It On" (from Magic and Medicine) and "In the Morning" (from The Invisible Invasion) have appeared in the top 20 of the UK Singles Chart.

The majority of The Coral songs are written by lead singer and rhythm guitarist James Skelly, with many songs also being co-written by keyboardist Nick Power. Lead guitarist Lee Southall has written some of their songs, whilst all members of the group have co-written at several points and the band has also written together in collaboration.

Scope of list
The scope of this list includes all songs appearing on any studio album, compilation album, EP or single by The Coral or any various artist compilation album containing a song by The Coral.

Songs

See also
 The Coral discography

Notes

References

External links
 
 

 
Coral, The